Waterworld, is the only studio album by American hip hop duo Leak Bros, which consisted of Cage and Tame One. It was released on July 13, 2004 under Eastern Conference Records.

Background 
Every song on Waterworld is about the drug PCP. Street names for PCP like "water," "wet," "leak," "fry", "sherm," "dip," "death," "angel dust," "dust," "purple rain," "embalming fluid," and "formaldehyde" are all constantly referenced throughout the album. Cage and Tame One frequently mention "dipping" cigarettes, blunts and other smoking material in PCP.

Music 
The album features production from Camu Tao, DJ Mighty Mi, El-P, J-Zone, RJD2, Mondee, Grimace, Kool Mellow Max 165, and Emz. Guest vocal appearances include Yak Ballz.

Release 
The single "Got Wet" b/w G.O.D. was released on July 20, 2004. Waterworld is the only release of the group.

Track listing

References

External links 
 Waterworld at Discogs
 Waterworld at Bandcamp

2004 debut albums
Leak Bros. albums
Eastern Conference Records albums
Albums produced by J-Zone
Albums produced by El-P